The 1896 Storrs Aggies football team represented Storrs Agricultural College, now the University of Connecticut, in the 1896 college football season.  This was the first year that the school fielded a football team.  The Aggies completed the season with a record of 5–3, against a mix of nearby high school and YMCA teams.

Schedule

References

Storrs
UConn Huskies football seasons
Storrs Aggies football